Onay Pineda Alvarado (born 16 June 1989) is a Mexican former professional footballer who played as a right-back.

Club career

Querétaro
Pineda made his debut on 2 April 2011 in a match against San Luis. Onay Pineda retired due to a foot injury that didn't heal right

Personal life
His younger brother, Orbelín Pineda, is also a professional footballer who currently plays as a midfielder for AEK Athens.

References

External links

1989 births
Living people
Footballers from Guerrero
Mexican footballers
Liga MX players
Querétaro F.C. footballers
Association football defenders